Miyetti Allah Cattle Breeders Association of Nigeria (sometimes also called MACBAN) is a loose partisan advocacy group centered on promoting the welfare of Fulani pastoralists in Nigeria. The organization was founded in the early 1970s with headquarters in Kaduna. It became legally operational in 1979 and gained wider acceptance as an advocacy group in 1987.

MACBAN represents the interests of about 100,000 semi-nomads and nomads in the country.

Name
Miyetti Allah means "I thank God" in Fulfulde.

History
Official records of the early history of Miyetti Allah are sparse, the oral history by some members trace it to the 1960s while others to 1972 when the association was formed in Kaduna. The association's early members were largely dominated by settled Fulanis whose early concept of Miyetti Allah was to promote the welfare of all Fulanis through self help. In the 1970s, the organization was led by Muhammadu Sa'adu, with membership in Kaduna and Plateau States. Sa'adu, who was born in Jos but spent his adulthood in Kaduna, was a key figure in the campaigns to get new members to join.

Both Kaduna and Plateau states had local branches affiliated with a local government or community, the meetings were irregular and not all national or state level resolutions were adhered to. But as the association expanded to more states, aims favoring nomadic education and access of grazing reserves by cattle breeders became a common theme.

Despite the best intentions of the organization, some Fulani communities have perceived Miyetti Allah as an ineffective government-aligned organization. As a result, some Fulani communities have become disillusioned with Miyetti Allah and resorted to forming their own vigilante groups.

Mission
A major goal of MACBAN is to be the umbrella organization of Fulani herdsmen within the country. The activities of the organization involves liaising with the government on behalf of pastoralists, land use rights, nomadic education and conflict resolution between pastoralists and farmers. The group also supports protecting and increasing grazing reserves for cattle breeders in the country. However, not all pastoralists intend to stay within grazing reserves and the organization provides information to convince grazing reserve skeptics among the nomads to buy into the idea.

As the major promoter of welfare of Fulani pastoralists, increase incidences of farmer-herder conflicts and cattle rustling since 2011 have brought the previously little known group into wider attention.

Structure
The group's board of trustees is led by the Sultan of Sokoto and it receives funding from the board and other donors. The national chairman is elected every four years. When MACBAN was founded, it received support from Sultan Abubakar III, Aminu, the Emir of Zazzau, Usman Nagogo, the Emir of Katsina, and Ado Bayero, the late Emir of Kano. The emirs of these emirates compose a part of the group's board of trustees.

MACBAN has a national secretariat at Kaduna and state offices.

See also
Herder–farmer conflicts in Nigeria

References

Advocacy groups in Nigeria
Agricultural organizations based in Nigeria
Fula people
Pastoralists
Animal husbandry